Schneider Rundfunkwerke AG was a German manufacturer of mass market audio equipment.

History
The origins of the company trace to 1889 in Türkheim, Swabia, Germany, when Felix Schneider founded a company manufacturing industrial woodworking tools. In 1965 the business entered the audio electronics market through the manufacture of radio cabinets

During the 1970s and 1980s the Schneider name became associated with audio systems; the company was unusual for a German audio systems manufacturer in that it focused on low cost products rather than the luxury sector.

In 1984 computers from the Amstrad company were marketed under the Schneider brand in Germany and central Europe. In 1987 the association with Amstrad ended, and the company produced PC compatible machines from 1988.

The Gebrüder Steidinger company (maker of the Dual turntable line) and brand were acquired from Thomson in 1988, in part to obtain a saleable brand name in France where the large and long established company Schneider SA was already present. In the 1990s the company's name was changed to Schneider Electronics

In 2002 the company was bankrupt. It was acquired by the TCL Corporation for €8.2 million in 2002.

See also
 Schneider Computer Division
 Schneider Euro PC

References

Consumer electronics brands
German brands
Electronics companies of Germany
Companies based in Bavaria
Electronics companies established in 1889
Electronics companies disestablished in 2002
2002 mergers and acquisitions
German companies disestablished in 2002
German companies established in 1889